Ludik is a surname. Notable people with the surname include:

Hugo Ludik (born 1983), Namibian cricketer and musician
Louis Ludik (born 1986), South African rugby union player
Milan Ludík (born 1992), Czech badminton player
Stefan Ludik (born 1981), Namibian musician, television personality, actor, and former cricketer